The South Africa women's national cricket team toured England in August and September 2014. They played against England in 3 Twenty20 Internationals and against Ireland in 3 Twenty20 Internationals. The first series was won 3–0 by England, whilst the second series was won 3–0 by South Africa.

Squads

Tour Matches

20-over match: England Academy v South Africa

20-over match: England Academy v South Africa

WT20I Series: England v South Africa

1st T20I

2nd T20I

3rd T20I

WT20I Series: Ireland v South Africa

1st T20I

2nd T20I

3rd T20I

References

External links
South Africa Women tour of England 2014 from Cricinfo

International cricket competitions in 2014
2014 in women's cricket
Women's cricket tours of England
South Africa women's national cricket team tours